Martin County Airport  is a county-owned, public-use airport in Martin County, North Carolina, United States. It is located six nautical miles (7 mi, 11 km) west of the central business district of Williamston, North Carolina. This airport is included in the National Plan of Integrated Airport Systems for 2011–2015, which categorized it as a general aviation facility.

Although most U.S. airports use the same three-letter location identifier for the FAA and IATA, this airport is assigned MCZ by the FAA but has no designation from the IATA (which assigned MCZ to Zumbi dos Palmares Airport in Maceió, Alagoas, Brazil). The airport's ICAO identifier is KMCZ.

Facilities and aircraft 
Martin County Airport covers an area of 110 acres (45 ha) at an elevation of 74 feet (23 m) above mean sea level. It has one runway designated 3/21 with an asphalt surface measuring 5,000 by 75 feet (1,524 x 23 m).

For the 12-month period ending September 5, 2011, the airport had 4,500 aircraft operations, an average of 12 per day: 89% general aviation and 11% military. At that time there were 6 aircraft based at this airport: 83% single-engine and 17% ultralight.

References

External links 
  from North Carolina DOT airport directory
 Aerial image as of March 1993 from USGS The National Map
 
 

Airports in North Carolina
Transportation in Martin County, North Carolina
Buildings and structures in Martin County, North Carolina